Saint Pirmin (latinized Pirminius, born before 700 ( according to many sources), died November 3, 753 in Hornbach), was a Merovingian-era monk and missionary.
He founded or restored numerous monasteries in Alemannia (Swabia),  especially in the Alsace, along the Upper Rhine and in the Lake Constance region.

Biography
Pirmin was probably from the area of Narbonne, possibly of Visigothic origin. Many Visigoths fled to Francia after the Arab conquest of Spain at the beginning of the 8th century.

From 718 onwards, he was abbot of the monastery Quortolodora in Antwerp (Austrasia) and, together with its pupils, the minister of the church inside the broch, Het Steen. (In the 12th century, this church was dedicated to Saint Walpurga.) After a while Pirmin was invited by count Rohingus to stay at his villa in Thommen, near Sankt Vith in the Ardennes.

Pirmin gained the favour of Charles Martel, mayor of the palace of Francia. He was sent to help rebuild Disentis Abbey in what is today Switzerland.  In 724, he was appointed abbot of Mittelzell Abbey on Reichenau Island, which had earlier founded. Later, for political reasons, he was banished to Alsace. In 753, he died in the abbey at Hornbach, where his body is entombed.

Missionary and other activities
Pirmin's missionary work mainly took place in the Alsace and the upper area of the Rhine and the Danube. Besides actively preaching and converting, he also founded or reformed many monasteries, such as those at Amorbach, Gengenbach, Murbach, Wissembourg, Marmoutier, Neuweiler, and Reichenau. Pirmin secured endowments from area nobility: Odilo of Bavaria financed the foundation of Niederaltaich Abbey, Werner I of what became the Salian dynasty endowed the new abbey at Hornbach.

The most important of Pirmin's books is Dicta Abbatis Pirminii, de Singulis Libris Canonicis Scarapsus ("Words of Abbot Pirminius, extracts from the Single Canonical Books"). The book collects quotations from Church Fathers and scriptures, presumably for use by missionaries, or reading during monastic meals. Written between 710-724, it contains the earliest appearance of the present text of the Apostles' Creed.

References

External links

See also 
Saint Boniface
Saint Willibrord
Schottenklöster

753 deaths
Medieval German saints
German abbots
8th-century Christian saints
670 births
Alsatian saints
Colombanian saints